LadyBoy is a 2019 Burmese comedy-drama action film, directed by Ko Pauk starring Pyay Ti Oo, Kyaw Kyaw Bo, Htoo Aung, Ei Chaw Po, Kaew Korravee, Khin Hlaing, Joker, Bank, P Nok and K Nyi. The film was filmed in collaboration with actors from Thailand and was shot in Bangkok, Thailand; produced by Bo Bo Film Production premiered Myanmar on June 6, 2019.

Cast
Pyay Ti Oo as Aung Shwe
Kyaw Kyaw Bo as Kyaw Kyaw Naing
Htoo Ag as Kideset
Ei Chaw Po as Cynthia
Kaew Korravee as Kide
Khin Hlaing as Ngwe Maung
Joker as Jo Jo
Bank as Gangster1#
P Nok as Gangster leader
K Nyi as Aung Gyi

References

2019 films
2010s Burmese-language films
Thai-language films
Thai multilingual films
Films shot in Thailand
2019 comedy-drama films
2010s action comedy-drama films
Burmese multilingual films
2019 multilingual films